Fritz Buntrock (8 March 1909 – 24 January 1948) was a German war criminal and SS-Unterscharführer (the SS equivalent to a corporal) serving at Auschwitz concentration camp during the Holocaust in occupied Poland. He was prosecuted at the first Auschwitz trial.

Due to his brutal treatment of prisoners he was nicknamed "Bulldog" in the camp. Buntrock supervised the gas chambers. Buntrock was tried by the Supreme National Tribunal in Kraków and sentenced to death. He was hanged in Montelupich Prison on 24 January 1948.

References

1909 births
1948 deaths
Auschwitz concentration camp personnel
Auschwitz trial executions
Military personnel from Osnabrück
Executed people from Lower Saxony
Romani genocide perpetrators
Waffen-SS personnel
German people convicted of crimes against humanity
Executed mass murderers